The Jurisdiction of the Armed Forces and Chaplaincy is the canonical residence for all chaplains requiring professional ecclesiastical endorsement for the Anglican Church in North America, for the Church of Nigeria North American Mission (CONNAM), and some continuing Anglican groups with loose connection to the world-wide Anglican Communion. It was created in 2007 as the Deanery of the Chaplaincy as part of the Convocation of Anglicans in North America of the Church of Nigeria (Anglican Communion), later becoming the Diocese of the Armed Forces and Chaplaincy of the Church of Nigeria in September 2011. When provisions for a "Special Jurisdiction" in the ACNA canons was created in June 2014, the Diocese of the Armed Forces and Chaplaincy, renamed the Jurisdiction of the Armed Forces and Chaplaincy (JAFC) in 2013, and by a protocol agreement between the Church of Nigeria and the ACNA, became the entity fulfilling the canonical role of the "Special" Jurisdiction for the ACNA, but remains a diocese of the Church of Nigeria. Just as other cooperative diocesan entities of the ACNA, the JAFC remains its own ministry corporately formed in the State of Alabama and is a 501(c)(3) organization. The founding bishop and first bishop of the JAFC is Derek Jones, affirmed unanimously at the Chaplains' first Convocation held in Orlando, FL in 2007.  He remains a bishop of the Church of Nigeria (Anglican Communion) and the ACNA.

The JAFC, as the Special Jurisdiction for the ACNA, supports the endorsement and care of chaplains serving in the United States Armed Forces, with federal and local governments, hospitals, law enforcement and other professional chaplaincies requiring formal ecclesiastical endorsement. There are currently 39 chaplain-led parishes in the United States and abroad (Guatemala, United Kingdom, Germany and Japan). The JAFC is also partnered with other ministries to help with their mission.

The JAFC elected on 11 January 2018 two new suffragan bishops, Michael Williams and Mark Nordstrom. Bishop Nordstrom had been Vicar General of the Diocese since the previous year. Bishop Williams served as the Archdeacon of the JAFC prior to his consecration. The new bishops' consecration took place on 12 April 2018, at St. Peter's Anglican Church, in Mountain Brook, Alabama.

References

External links
Special Jurisdiction of the Armed Forces and Chaplaincy Official Website

Dioceses of the Anglican Church in North America
Anglican dioceses established in the 21st century